is a passenger railway station located in the town of Harima, Hyōgo Prefecture, Japan, operated by the private Sanyo Electric Railway.

Lines

Station layout
The station consists of two unnumbered elevated side platforms with the station building underneath.

Platforms

Adjacent stations

|-
!colspan=5|Sanyo Electric Railway

History
It was renamed on April 7, 1991.

Passenger statistics
In fiscal 2018, the station was used by an average of 2,595 passengers daily (boarding passengers only).

Surrounding area
 Harima Town Hall 
 Hyogo Prefectural Archaeological Museum
 Harima Onaka Ancient Village

See also
List of railway stations in Japan

References

External links

  Official website (Sanyo Electric Railway) 

Railway stations in Japan opened in 1923
Railway stations in Hyōgo Prefecture
Harima, Hyōgo